VDARE is an American far-right website promoting opposition to immigration to the United States. It is associated with white supremacy, white nationalism,  and the alt-right. Anti-Immigration in the United States: A Historical Encyclopedia describes VDARE as "one of the most prolific anti-immigration media outlets in the United States" and states that it is "broadly concerned with race issues in the United States". Established in 1999, the website's editor is Peter Brimelow, who once stated that "whites built American culture" and that "it is at risk from non-whites who would seek to change it".

The Southern Poverty Law Center describes VDARE as "an anti-immigration hate website" which "regularly publishes articles by prominent white nationalists, race scientists and anti-Semites", including Steve Sailer, Jared Taylor, J. Philippe Rushton, Samuel T. Francis, John Derbyshire and Pat Buchanan. Brimelow acknowledges that VDARE published writings by white nationalists but has said that VDARE is not a "white nationalist Web site".

History

Peter Brimelow, who edits VDARE, is a former editor at the National Review and Fortune. The English-born Brimelow founded the website in 1999 under the auspices of the Center for American Unity, a Virginia-based organization that he also founded in 1999. VDARE was founded as an outgrowth of Brimelow's anti-immigration activism and the publication of his book Alien Nation: Common Sense About America's Immigration Disaster. The website says it is concerned with the "racial and culture identity of America" and "honest consideration of race and ethnicity, the foundations of human grouping, that human differences can be explained and their social consequences understood, whether those differences are philosophical, cultural or biological."

Brimelow was president of the center, which funded VDARE.com until 2007, when the center announced an intent to focus on litigation. The VDARE Foundation, a 501(c)(3) organization, was formed by Brimelow to take the place of the center as the website's sponsor. Brimelow's wife, Lydia Brimelow, is VDARE's advancement officer.

The name VDARE and the site's logo, the head of a white doe, refer to Virginia Dare, the first child born to English settlers in the New World in the late 16th century. Dare disappeared along with every other member of the Roanoke Colony. Anti-Immigration in the United States: A Historical Encyclopedia explains that "For Brimelow, Anglo-Saxon Americans and their culture are in danger of disappearing like Virginia Dare; he writes that he considered adding a fictional vignette at the end of his book Alien Nation (1995), in which the last white family flees Los Angeles, which had been overrun by the crime and pollution caused by its non-white residents."

Brimelow has written on the site that United States immigration policy constitutes "Adolf Hitler’s posthumous revenge on America". In a radio interview with Alan Colmes, he said he wished to return to the US immigration policies before 1965, when restrictions to non-whites were lifted, as "the US is a white nation."

In February 2020, the VDARE Foundation purchased the Samuel Taylor Suit Cottage (also known as the Berkeley Castle or Berkeley Springs Castle), a Medieval-style castle located on a hill above Berkeley Springs, in the Eastern Panhandle of West Virginia, for $1.4 million.

Hate speech and white nationalism

Designation as a hate website
The Southern Poverty Law Center (SPLC), which tracks extremist groups in the United States, wrote that VDARE was "once a relatively mainstream anti-immigration page" but had become "a meeting place for many on the radical right" by 2003. The SPLC describes VDARE as "an anti-immigration hate website" which "regularly publishes articles by prominent white nationalists, race scientists and anti-Semites". The SPLC cited examples such as a column concerning immigration from Mexico that warned of a "Mexican invasion" where "high teenage birthrates, poverty, ignorance and disease will be what remains", and an essay complaining how the U.S. government encourages "the garbage of Africa" to come to the United States.

The SPLC has described VDARE's contributor list as "a Rolodex of the most prominent pseudo-intellectual racists and anti-Semites. They include people such as Jared Taylor and Kevin MacDonald. Taylor (who Brimelow acknowledges is a "white nationalist") once wrote that black people are incapable of sustaining any kind of civilization, while MacDonald is a retired professor who wrote a trilogy claiming that Jews are genetically driven to undermine the Christian societies they live in. Another (former contributor), Sam Francis, was the editor of a newspaper published by the Council of Conservative Citizens, a white supremacist group. Francis died in 2005.

The Anti-Defamation League (ADL) similarly concludes that "VDARE posts, promotes, and archives the work of racists, anti-immigrant figures, and anti-Semites".

In November 2019, The Guardian identified VDARE as one of several white nationalist websites which had remained active on Facebook, contrary to Facebook's stated intention to ban such material. In May 2020, VDARE and the similar website The Unz Review were banned by Facebook. According to Facebook, the sites formed a network of "coordinated inauthentic behavior" intended to influence the 2020 election via fake accounts.

Attempted delisting
In June 2020, the domain registrar Network Solutions announced plans to terminate the account for VDARE. An attorney for Network Solutions cited a policy prohibiting customers using its domains from "display[ing] bigotry, racism, discrimination, or hatred in any manner whatsoever", and stated that VDARE had until June 26 to transfer its domain name to a different registrar before it would be deleted. An update to its WHOIS data was made on June 26, 2020. , the domain exists under a different registrar.

White nationalist writings
VDARE is regarded as a white nationalist website. David Weigel wrote in 2010 that the site "is best known for publishing work by white nationalists while maintaining that it is not a white nationalist site".

Brimelow "denies that the organization itself is white nationalist, but he admits that VDARE.com provides a forum for a variety of viewpoints, including white nationalism". Of individuals like Taylor, Brimelow has written they "aim to defend the interests of American whites. They are not white supremacists. They do not advocate violence. They are rational and civil." As immigration from the developing world increases, he believes "this type of interest-group 'white nationalism' will inexorably increase." Brimelow has participated on panels multiple times with Taylor and Richard Spencer on the aims of the alt-right.

References

External links

 
 SPLC Profile

Alt-right websites
American political blogs
White nationalism in the United States
Immigration political advocacy groups in the United States
White nationalist groups